The Midwest Collegiate Sailing Association (MCSA) is one of the seven conferences within the Inter-Collegiate Sailing Association, the governing body for collegiate competition in the sport of sailing.

The MCSA consists of teams from midwestern United States.

Members

References

External links
 Official website

ICSA conferences